The Bismarck Tower in Zielona Góra, Poland (until 1945 Grünberg in Schlesien, Lower Silesia, Germany) is one of the best-preserved Bismarck towers outside of present-day Germany. It is also called the Wilkanowska Tower, after the hill on which it stands.

Despite its name, the tower is actually located in the village of Wilkanowo, Lubusz Voivodeship (Wittgenau in German), 6 km southwest of Zielona Góra. It is still in use as an observation tower and radio mast.

History

The tower was proposed by architect Albert Severin, with the support of the Grünberg Commercial and Horticultural Association. The club purchased a plot of land on the Meiseberg, outside the village of Wittgenau, for construction of the tower. The foundation stone was laid on 1 April 1902 (Bismarck's birthday); construction was carried out by local master mason Carl Mühle.

The tower was completed in just four months at a cost of 6,000 marks; it was inaugurated on 23 August 1902. Above the entrance was a relief of Otto von Bismarck, and the inscription "ERECTED IN 1902/COMMERCIAL AND HORTICULTURAL ASSOCIATION OF GRÜNBERG".

Description

The tower is 20 m high and stands atop Wilkanowska Hill (formerly Meiseberg), 221 m above sea level. It is built entirely from bricks, with crenellations at the top.

Contemporary situation

After Germany's defeat in World War II, Grünberg was transferred to Poland and renamed Zielona Góra. There was little fighting in the town during the war, and so the tower emerged unscathed.

As of April 1992, all references to Bismarck were removed; however there is currently a sign above the entrance in place of the old German inscription. In Polish, it reads "BISMARCK TOWER - AUTHORITIES OF ZIELONA GÓRA - AD 1902". The elevation of the tower is also mentioned.

Unlike other crumbling Bismarck towers beyond the present-day German borders, the Zielona Góra Tower is in excellent condition, having been restored in 2003, and is still used for multiple purposes: a fire lookout tower, weather vane, observation tower, and communications mast. In good weather, it is open to the public for a small fee.

External links
Bismarck tower in Grünberg (Zielona Góra) (in German) 
Bismarck tower in Zielona Góra (in Polish) 

Prussian cultural sites
Zielona Gora
Monuments and memorials in Poland
Buildings and structures in Lubusz Voivodeship